Evryday Hustle is the second EP by American rapper Mr. Envi'. The EP was released on May 27, 2016 by his record label Southern Stisles Records.

Background
On January 23, 2016 Mr. Envi' announced he would release a two part EP series in 2016. "Evryday Hustle" would serve as the first of the two releases and the second, entitled "All Nite Grind", was scheduled to be released later in the year, around September 2016. On April 8, 2016 he released the single "Where We Goin'" featuring Chucky Workclothes, shortly after the official track list was announced.

Track listing

References

External links 
 Evryday Hustle on iTunes. 
 Evryday Hustle on Amazon.

Mr. Envi' albums
2015 EPs
Self-released EPs